Solar wind is a stellar phenomenon of the Sun

Solar wind may also refer to:

 Stellar wind, gas ejected from the atmosphere of stars
 Solar Winds, a computer game
 SolarWinds, a network management software company
 Solar Winds hack, a nickname for the 2020 United States federal government data breach, in which the network management company was a target
 Solar Wind (comic), a British comic
 Hearing Solar Winds, an album of composer David Hykes
 "Solar Wind", a song by Snowkel which is also the second ending theme for Japanese anime series Kiba
 Solar Wind (album), a 1974 album by pianist Ramsey Lewis

See also
 Stellar wind (disambiguation)